Erythrotrichia welwitschii is a red algae species in the genus Erythrotrichia found in South Africa from Cape of Good Hope and False Bay extending eastwards at least as far as Port Elizabeth.

References

Compsopogonophyceae
Species described in 1902